Maria Valeryevna Mazina (born 18 April 1964) is a Russian women's épée fencer. She is an Olympic champion, and a 5-time world women's épée champion.

Early and personal life
Mazina was born in Moscow, Russia, and is Jewish. She lives in Moscow.

Fencing career
Mazina began fencing at the age of 12.

Mazina is a 5-time world women's épée champion.

Olympics
She won a team bronze medal in the 1996 Olympics. Mazina and her teammates defeated Hungary in the third-place match (45–44) to capture the bronze medal.

Mazina also won a gold medal in the Sydney Olympics in team épée in 2000. Russia defeated Switzerland, 45–35, in the final.  In the individual épée competition, Mazina was eliminated in the third round by Margherita Zalaffi of Italy (13–15).

Maccabiah Games
Mazina won a gold medal in the 2001 Maccabiah Games.

Coaching

She is an instructor at Maccabi Moscow, of which she has been a member since 1995 when it was first organized. She visited Israel for a Maccabi program. In 2015, she was the Russian Federation's épée team coach.

See also
 List of select Jewish fencers

References

External links
 Jews in Sports bio

1964 births
Living people
Russian female épée fencers
Olympic fencers of Russia
Fencers at the 2000 Summer Olympics
Fencers at the 1996 Summer Olympics
Jewish female épée fencers
Jewish sportswomen
Jewish Russian sportspeople
Olympic gold medalists for Russia
Olympic bronze medalists for Russia
Competitors at the 2001 Maccabiah Games
Maccabiah Games medalists in fencing
Maccabiah Games gold medalists for Russia
Martial artists from Moscow
Olympic medalists in fencing
Medalists at the 1996 Summer Olympics
Medalists at the 2000 Summer Olympics
Russian fencing coaches